Nermine Hammam (born 1967) is an Egyptian artist who lives and works in Cairo and London.

She was born in Cairo and later moved to England and then the United States in 1985. She received a BFA in film-making from the Tisch School of the Arts in New York City. She worked in film with Simon & Goodman and then with Egyptian director Youssef Chahine. She was a production assistant on the 1992 Spike Lee film Malcolm X.  Hammam subsequently worked as a graphic designer before moving on to visual arts and photography.

As a female photographer, Hammam said she "entered this traditionally male-dominated space, camera in hand, inverting conventional power relationships to ‘shoot’ the soldiers. Their response to my presence, as a woman, in their midst, has become part of the ‘facts’ documented in these images.” 

She is known for the distinct technique with which she reworks photography, addressing the influence of mass media and market stylization.  Her layered, digitally manipulated works explore the subjective nature of reality. As the founder and creative director of Equinox Graphics, Hammam is also known for introducing art into the public space through innovative design and branding. She is behind some of Egypt’s most familiar brands, including Cilantro Café, Diwan Bookstores and the Deyafa group of restaurants and bars.

Her work has been included in solo and group exhibitions in Egypt, France, Italy, the United Kingdom, Denmark, the United States, Kuwait and Singapore. Hammam's work is included in the collections of the Victoria and Albert Museum in London, the Tropenmuseum in Amsterdam and the Parco Horcynus Orca in Italy.

Over the past decade, her work has been shown in more than seventy-five international exhibitions with over 7 exhibitions in the UK alone. Her work has been featured in over 50 publications and written about in the magazines such as Newsweek (USA), Financial Times (UK), and The Times (UK).

In her exhibition Cairo Year One in London, Hammam used the style of traditional Japanese painting to present violent scenes from the Egyptian Revolution of 2011. Cairo Year One featured ten photographs from the first part of the “Cairo Year One” series, “Upekkha” (2011), and two from later works in the series, “Unfolding” (2012), are on view in the exhibition. Hammam juxtaposes images of soldiers in Tahrir Square during the uprising with peaceful scenes from her personal collection of postcards. “This work is about youth, universal youth, and the harshness and inhumanity of sending our children to war,” says Hammam. Inspired by propaganda posters from the 1940s and ’50s depicting strong figures in idealized settings, Hammam says, “The backgrounds emphasize the discordant presence of armed men among civilians in Tahrir: men of war in Paradise.” 

Hammam is a photographer. He received Freedom to Create 2011 first prize; Worldwide Photography Gala Awards 2011 first prize; Julia Margaret Cameron Award 2012 honorable mention; Jacob Riis Award 2010 runner-up; and Invisible World Portfolio Selection 2010 Finalist honorable mention.

References 

1967 births
Living people
20th-century Egyptian women artists
21st-century Egyptian women artists
20th-century women photographers
21st-century women photographers
Photographers from Cairo
Egyptian women photographers